"I Need to Hear It from You" is a song recorded by Canadian country music artist Joan Kennedy. It was released in 1992 as the first single from her fifth studio album, Higher Ground. It peaked at number 9 on the RPM Country Tracks chart in February 1993.

Chart performance

References

1992 songs
1992 singles
Joan Kennedy (musician) songs
MCA Records singles
Songs written by Thom McHugh